Samuel Whitbread (5 May 1830 – 25 December 1915) was an English brewer and Liberal Party politician who sat in the House of Commons from 1852 to 1895.

Biography
Whitbread was the eldest son of Samuel Charles Whitbread of Cardington, Bedfordshire and his wife Julia Brand, daughter of Lord Dacre. He was a member of the Whitbread brewing family. Whitbread was educated at Rugby School and Trinity College, Cambridge. He was private secretary to Sir George Grey in 1850 and in 1852 was elected as a Member of Parliament (MP) for Bedford. He was a frequent speaker during his time in the commons and was Civil Lord of the Admiralty from June 1859 to March 1863. He held his seat until 1895.
 
Whitbread lived at Southill Park, Biggleswade. He was J.P. and Deputy Lieutenant for Bedfordshire. He died at the age of 85.

Family 
Whitbread married Lady Isabella Charlotte Pelham, youngest daughter of Henry Pelham, 3rd Earl of Chichester on 9 July 1855. They had four children together, Samuel, Maude, Henry, and Francis.

His eldest son, Samuel Howard, followed his father into politics.
Maud married her cousin Charles, son of Samuel's younger brother William.
Henry married Mary Raymond and lived at Norton Bavant, Warminster.
Francis married Ida, daughter of Charles Hanbury-Tracy, 4th Baron Sudeley, and lived at Burford House, Tenbury Wells.

References

External links
 

1830 births
1915 deaths
People educated at Rugby School
Alumni of Trinity College, Cambridge
Liberal Party (UK) MPs for English constituencies
UK MPs 1852–1857
UK MPs 1857–1859
UK MPs 1859–1865
UK MPs 1865–1868
UK MPs 1868–1874
UK MPs 1874–1880
UK MPs 1880–1885
UK MPs 1885–1886
UK MPs 1886–1892
UK MPs 1892–1895
Deputy Lieutenants of Bedfordshire
People from Southill, Bedfordshire
Lords of the Admiralty